The voiced uvular lateral approximant is a type of consonantal sound used in some spoken languages. The letter for a back-velar in the Uralic Phonetic Alphabet, may also be used.

Features
Features of the voiced uvular lateral approximant:

Occurrence

Notes

References

 
 

Lateral consonants
Uvular consonants
Pulmonic consonants
Oral consonants
Voiced consonants